Wheelchair basketball was one of the 23 sports featured at the 2nd Asian Para Games 2014, which took place in Incheon, South Korea on October 16–24, 2014. The event was held at the 7,406 seat Samsan World Gymnasium.

Medal summary

Medal table

Medalists

Results

Men

Preliminary round

Group A

Group B

Final round

Semifinals

9–10th-place match

7–8th-place match

5–6th-place match

Bronze-medal match

Gold-medal match

Final standings

Women

Final standings

References

External links
Men's Result of the tournament Summary
Women's Result of the tournament Summary
Medal Standings of Wheelchair Basketball
Medallists of Men's Wheelchair Basketball
Medallists of Women's Wheelchair Basketball

2014
2014–15 in Asian basketball
Wheelchair
International basketball competitions hosted by South Korea
2014–15 in South Korean basketball